Albert Road Halt was a railway station in  Plymouth in the English county of Devon. It was located between Ford and Devonport Park tunnels.

History

The station was opened by the Plymouth, Devonport and South Western Junction Railway on 1 November 1906, or possibly 1 October 1906. This confusion may be the result of a complaint by the PDSWJR to the London and South Western Railway in September 1906 that while they had constructed the halt, the LSWR had not provided any service, and it is reported that services commenced before the official opening of 1 November.

Although this company remained independent until the grouping, the LSWR used its tracks as an entry to Plymouth that did not involve its rival the Great Western Railway.  Becoming part of the Southern Railway during the Grouping of 1923, it closed on 13 January 1947, less than a year before nationalisation.

The site today

The station has now been demolished.

See also
 Devonport Albert Road (GWR station)
 Exeter to Plymouth railway of the LSWR

References 

Archive

Railway stations in Great Britain opened in 1906
Railway stations in Great Britain closed in 1947
Disused railway stations in Plymouth, Devon
Former Plymouth, Devonport and South Western Junction Railway stations